Mikhail Alekseyevich Romanov (1895–1961) was an association football player.

International career
Romanov made his debut for Russia on July 5, 1914, in a friendly against Sweden.

External links
  Profile

1895 births
1961 deaths
Russian footballers
Russia international footballers
Association football midfielders